Cserhát is a mountain range in Hungary, part of the North Hungarian Mountains, divided between Pest and Nógrád counties. Its highest point is the Naszály with an elevation of 654 metres above sea level.

Cserhát stretches from Cserhátalja to the valley of the Ipoly river. Its central part is mountainous, covered with forests, while its southern and northern parts are hilly.

Architecturally, the territory is rich in castles. Hollókő, an ethnographic village, is located there.

See also
Geography of Hungary
North Hungarian Mountains

Mountain ranges of Hungary
Mountain ranges of the Western Carpathians